Jordan Coulson is a British  actor. His next role will be portraying the role of Howard ‘Hambone’ Hamilton in ‘Masters of The Air’ Produced by Tom Hanks and Steven Spielberg on Apple+ In 2023. Jordan is also known for roles such as playing Jed in “Romantic Getaway”  Kevin in Stephen Poliakoff's television series Summer of Rockets. He also played a random mobster in The Batman

Filmography

Television

Film

Web series

References

External links

Jordan Coulson's CV

Living people
British male television actors
21st-century British male actors
Year of birth missing (living people)